Linda is a 1929 American silent drama film directed by Dorothy Davenport (as Mrs. Wallace Reid).

Plot 

 Linda (Helen Foster), a tender, romantic girl, is forced by her brutal father to marry Decker (Noah Beery, Sr.) an elderly lumberman who quickly realizes that Linda is not happy with him and does everything he can to make her life easier. Linda falls in love with Dr. Paul Randall (Warner Baxter), but remains with her husband until a scheming woman steps in and claims to be Decker's first and legal wife. Linda then goes to the city to live with her former schoolteacher and again meets Dr. Randall, but must leave him to return north and care for Decker, who has been hurt in a lumbering accident. Learning that the woman claiming to be Decker's wife is a fraud, Linda gallantly sticks with her husband until he finally dies from his injuries. Linda and the good doctor are then free to find happiness with each other.

Cast 
 Warner Baxter - Dr. Paul Randall
 Helen Foster - Linda
 Noah Beery, Sr. - Armstrong Decker
 Mitchell Lewis - Buddy Stillwater
 Kate Price - Nan
Allen Connor - Kenneth Whitmore
Bess Flowers - Annette Whitmore
Billie Brockwell - Mother / Mrs. Stillwater
Monty O'Grady - Spider

Uncredited 

 James Conaty - Party Guest
 Jackie Levine - Stillwater Child
 Andy Shuford - Buddy Stillwater
 Blackjack Ward - Lumberjack

References

External links 

1929 drama films
1929 films
American drama films
American black-and-white films
1920s American films
1920s English-language films